The United States Federal Energy Management Program (FEMP) promotes energy efficiency and the use of renewable energy resources at federal sites,  helping agencies save energy, save taxpayer dollars, and demonstrate leadership with responsible, cleaner energy choices, because as the largest energy consumer in the United States, the federal government has both a tremendous opportunity and a clear responsibility to lead by example with smart energy management.

Equipment procurement
Use FEMP's product recommendations and other useful tips to help you buy the most efficient equipment for your offices and facilities and programs.

New constructions and retrofits 
Learn about how to design high performance buildings that save energy, save money, enhance indoor environmental quality, and help preserve the environment.

Operations and maintenance 
Learn how effective operations and maintenance can help you ensure reliability, safety, and energy at relatively low cost.

Utility management 
Find up to date information about energy markets, utility restructuring, renewable power purchasing, and load management opportunities that can help you manage costs, improve reliability, and reduce environmental impacts.

See also 
 Cognizant Contracting Officer
 White House Council on Environmental Quality
 Energy Savings Performance Contract (ESPC)
 Indefinite delivery indefinite quantity (IDIQ)
 Re-compete
 RFP

External links 
 http://www1.eere.energy.gov/femp/
 GovEnergy Workshop and Trade Show

United States Department of Energy
Renewable energy in the United States